Jazz Middelheim is an annual summer jazz festival in Antwerp, Belgium. The first festival took place in 1969 as a jazz promenade in the Middelheim Park.

2010
The 2010 edition presented  Toots Thielemans, Wayne Shorter, McCoy Tyner, Joe Lovano, Cassandra Wilson, Archie Shepp, Ahmad Jamal, World Saxophone Quartet, Chucho Valdés, Dave Holland, Pepe Habichuela, Jef Neve, José James, Jeroen Van Herzeele, Aka Moon, and Baba Sissoko.

References

External links

 

Culture in Antwerp
Jazz festivals in Belgium
Music festivals established in 1969
Summer events in Belgium
Summer festivals
Tourist attractions in Antwerp
1969 establishments in Belgium